Valentina Gerasimova (born May 15, 1948 in Quaraghandy, Quaraghandy Province, Kazakhstan) was a Soviet era track and field athlete specializing in middle distances.  She competed in the 1976 Olympics.  She entered the event as the world record holder, having run a 1:56.0 in Kiev just a month earlier in qualifying for the Olympics (though the mark had not yet been ratified as the world record, which it was after the Olympics).  That time was a second and a half improvement on the previous record set by Bulgarian Svetla Zlateva and proved to be her personal best in the event.

In the Montreal Olympics, she qualified for the semi-finals but was unable to make the final with a sub-par performance, as 6 of the qualifiers ahead of her bettered the standing Olympic record.  In the final, teammate Tatyana Kazankina took Gerasimova's world record, improving an additional second plus to 1:54.94.

References

1948 births
Living people
Athletes (track and field) at the 1976 Summer Olympics
World record setters in athletics (track and field)
Olympic athletes of the Soviet Union
Sportspeople from Karaganda
Soviet female middle-distance runners